is a Japanese military science fiction mecha anime series produced by Nippon Sunrise, created and directed by Ryosuke Takahashi and featuring mechanical designs by Kunio Okawara. Following directly in the footsteps of Takahashi's previous series, Fang of the Sun Dougram, VOTOMS continued the trend towards hard science in the mecha anime subgenre. 

The series was supplemented by numerous original video animation releases, and also inspired a number of spin-off works whose media ranges from serialized light novels to video games. The TV anime was originally licensed by the now-defunct Central Park Media, which released the series on DVD and VHS. Currently, it is licensed by Maiden Japan, a unit of Section23 Films, which has also released all OVAs other than Armor Hunter Mellowlink.

Plot

In the Astragius Galaxy, the Gilgamesh and Balarant nations had until recently been locked in a century-old galactic war whose cause was long ago forgotten. Now, the war is ending and an uneasy truce has settled. The main weapon of the conflict is the common Armored Trooper, a mass-produced humanoid combat vehicle piloted by a single soldier. Both the Armored Troopers and their pilots are also known as VOTOMS (Vertical One-man Tank for Offense & ManeuverS). However, since Armored Troopers have extremely thin armor, and use a highly combustible liquid in their artificial muscle, their pilots have a very low chance of survival, and are commonly referred to instead as "Bottoms", the lowest of the low ("Votoms" and "Bottoms" are written and pronounced the same way in Japanese).

The series follows a main character named Chirico Cuvie, a special forces Armored Trooper pilot and former member of the Red Shoulder Battalion, an elite force used by the Gilgamesh Confederation in its war against the Balarant Union. Chirico is suddenly transferred to a unit engaged in a suspicious mission, unaware that he is aiding to steal secrets from what appears to be his own side. Chirico is betrayed and left behind to die, but he survives, is arrested by the Gilgamesh military as a traitor, and tortured for information on their homeworld. He escapes, triggering a pursuit extending across the entire series, with Chirico hunted by the army and criminals alike as he seeks the truth behind the operation. He is especially driven to discover the truth of one of the objects he was assigned to retrieve in that operation: a mysterious and beautiful woman who would become his sole clue to unravelling the galactic conspiracy.

Development
Ryōsuke Takahashi conceived of VOTOMS after watching the American film Junior Bonner, in which the main character travels across towns performing rodeo shows, which gave Takahashi the idea of creating a story in a post-war setting, with mechs fighting each other for sport. Although several authors have noted similarities between Chirico and Steve McQueen, who played the main character in Junior Bonner, Takahashi stated that Chirico was not modeled after anyone in particular.

Anime

Armored Troopers VOTOMS (TV series)
A 1983 52-episode anime television series.

Cast
 Hozumi Gōda as Chirico Cuvie
 Kazuko Yanaga as Fyana
 Kōsei Tomita as Bouleuse Gotho
 Yōko Kawanami as Coconna
 Shigeru Chiba as Vanilla Vartla
 Issei Masamune as Ru Shako
 Kyonosuke Kami as Ypsilon
 Yūsaku Yara as Maj. Gimual Iskui 
 Kenichi Ogata as Maj. Serge Borough, Albert Killy
 Akio Nojima as Aaron Schmittel
 Issei Futamata as Gurran Schmittel 
 Shunji Yamada as 2nd Lt. Kudal Conin
 Banjō Ginga as Cap. Jean-Paul Rochina

The Last Red Shoulder
 is a 50-minute OVA released on August 21, 1985. The storyline takes place after the Woodoo storyline in the TV series. It details Chirico meeting with his old comrades in his old military unit, and their plan to get revenge on General Pailsen.

The Big Battle
A 1986 60-minute OVA. Takes place near the end of the series. The storyline features Chirico and his comrades participating in a mecha gladiatorial match.

The Red Shoulder Document - Origin of Ambition
, released as just Origin of Ambition by Maiden Japan, is a 60-minute OVA released in 1988. The storyline serves as a prequel to the main series and especially The Last Red Shoulder. It details Chirico's time in the Red Shoulder elite military unit and his encounters with General Pailsen.

Armor Hunter Mellowlink
 is a twelve episode anime science fiction action OVA series spinoff of Armored Trooper Votoms. It premiered on November 21, 1988. It takes place in the same universe (and time, and in some episodes, almost the same places) as Votoms, but the two stories are entirely independent of each other.

Mellowlink is the story of a soldier whose unit is sacrificed on the battlefield for reasons unknown. Although he was not meant to survive, the main character, Ality Mellowlink, manages to survive only to be framed for a crime he did not commit. Mellowlink escapes his captors and begins hunting down his former commanding officers, both to get revenge for his dead platoon members and to find out the nature of the conspiracy that led to their death.

The series is available for download on Bandai Visual's official website and the Japanese DVD box set was released on December 6, 2006. The series was previously issued twice on laserdisc, once as six individual volumes, and once as a three-disc box set along with the two soundtracks.

Brilliantly Shining Heresy
 is a 5-episode OVA series released in 1994. It is a sequel to the original TV series.

Pailsen Files 

 is a 12-episode OVA series that was released from October 26, 2007 to August 22, 2008. It was also released as a feature film on January 17, 2009. It is a prequel to the main series and a sequel to Origin of Ambition.

Phantom Arc
, released as Genei ~ Phantom Arc by Maiden Japan, is a six-part OVA series that was released from March 26, 2010 to October 27, 2010. It is a sequel to the original TV series and Shining Heresy.

Case; Irvine
Armored Trooper VOTOMS Case;Irvine (ケース;アービン), an OVA that follows the story of Irvine Lester, a repairer of the tank-like robotic Armored Trooper (AT) mecha in the VOTOMS story world.

Votoms Finder
Votoms Finder (ボトムズファインダー), an "alternate universe" OVA that centers around Aki Tesuno, a Bottoms guard for scrap salvagers and a pilot of a robotic mecha called an At or Altro (as opposed to VOTOMS' trademark Armored Trooper mecha).

Alone Again
, released as Chirico's Return by Maiden Japan, is a 2011 50-minute OVA that serves as sequel to the Shining Heresy and prequel to the Phantom Arc.

Games

Video games
VOTOMS has appeared in numerous video games since the series' original airing. 
X68000: Dead Ash
PC8801: Black Unicorn
PC-9801: Votoms: The Real Battle
Super Famicom: Votoms - The Battling Road
PlayStation: Blue Sabre Knights
PlayStation: Armored Trooper Votoms - Uoodo and Kummen
PlayStation: Brave Saga (as a guest character)
PlayStation: Armored Trooper Votoms Lightning Slash
PlayStation: Armored Trooper Votoms Steel Force
PlayStation: Brave Saga 2 (as a guest character)
Dreamcast: Sunrise Eiyuutan (as a guest character)
PlayStation 2: Sunrise Eiyuutan 2 (as a guest character)
WonderSwan: Harobots (as a guest character)
Game Boy Color: GB Harobots (as a guest character)
Game Boy Color: Brave Saga Shinsou Astaria (as a guest character)
PlayStation 2: Soukou Kihei Votoms / Armored Trooper Votoms
PlayStation Portable: Super Robot Wars Z2: Hakai-Hen (as a guest character)
PlayStation Portable: Super Robot Wars Z2: Saisei-Hen (as a guest character)
PlayStation Portable: Super Robot Wars OE (as a guest character)
PlayStation 3/PlayStation Vita: Super Robot Wars Z3: Jigoku-Hen (as a guest character)
PlayStation 4/Nintendo Switch: Super Robot Wars T (as a guest character)

For a limited time, the Armored Trooper Votoms - Uoodo and Kummen game included a Red Shoulder Custom model. Chirico also figures in the Sunrise Eiyuutan (Sunrise Heroes) game for the PlayStation 2.

Role-playing
VOTOMS was a direct inspiration for the Heavy Gear role-playing game. VOTOMS also has its own official role-playing game, Armored Trooper VOTOMS: The Roleplaying Game, developed by R. Talsorian Games and using the Fuzion system.

References

Further reading

External links
 
Episode Synopses

1983 anime television series debuts
1983 manga
1985 anime OVAs
1986 anime OVAs
1988 anime OVAs
1994 anime OVAs
2010 anime OVAs
2011 anime OVAs
Anime with original screenplays
Bandai Namco franchises
Central Park Media
Family Soft games
Fictional weapons
Kodansha manga
Maiden Japan
Mecha anime and manga
Military science fiction
Real robot anime and manga
Sunrise (company)
Takara video games
TV Tokyo original programming
Video games developed in Japan
Hard science fiction
Fiction about space warfare
Military fiction